Cerler, officially called Aramón Cerler, is a ski resort situated above the village of Cerler in the high Benasque Valley, near the town of Benasque in the central Pyrenees (province of Huesca, Spain). Near Cerler are the highest peaks of the Pyrenees, Aneto, Monte Perdido, and Posets.

The resort
Cerler has 72 km of marked pistes and is one of the highest resorts of the Pyrenees. The highest point is 'Gallinero' peak, at 2650 m AMSL, giving a vertical drop of 1150 m.

Cerler village, situated at 1500 m AMSL, forms the base of the resort and comprises a traditional nucleus and a purpose-built extension that includes several hotels and apartment complexes. From there a 4-seat chair lift provides the main access for the resort. The resort itself occupies two different high mountain valleys, defining two sectors: Cerler and Ampriu. Each sector is accessible by road and has a parking area, both sectors are linked by chair lifts.

Lifts
Almost all of the resort's lifts are modern and of high capacity , the resort has:

 9 chair lifts.
 5 ski tows.
 5 magic carpet lifts.
 total skiers: 24,800/hour

Pistes
The resort offers 65 pistes of different difficulties:

 7 beginners.
  16 easy.
  25 intermediate.
  14 expert.

Services

 4 restaurants.
 3 skiing school.
 1 snow gardens for children.
 1 kindergarten
 2 ski hiring stores.

External links
 http://www.aramon.com - Official resort site.
 http://www.cerler.es - Cerler Benasque Guide.

Ski areas and resorts in Aragon
Pyrenees